The Torneo Nacional de Clubes 2017 (2017 Clubs National Tournament) was the 42nd edition of the main clubs handball tournament organised by the Confederación Argentina de Handball, it was held between August and September  at the cities of Córdoba, Montecarlo and the Final Four at Villa Ballester.

Groups Stage

Group A
Group A was played at Córdoba

Group B
Group B was played at Montecarlo

Knockout stage

Final Four

Semi finals

3rd place match

Final

Final standing

References

External links
CAH Official website

Arg